Gilbert Scorsoglio (born 21 July 1932) is a Monegasque former sports shooter. He competed at the 1960 Summer Olympics and the 1968 Summer Olympics.

References

1932 births
Living people
Monegasque male sport shooters
Olympic shooters of Monaco
Shooters at the 1960 Summer Olympics
Shooters at the 1968 Summer Olympics